The Benjamin Franklin Z Grill, or simply "Z-Grill", is a 1-cent postage stamp issued by the United States Postal Service in February 1868 depicting Benjamin Franklin.  While stamps of this design were the common 1-cent stamps of the 1860s, the Z-Grill is distinguished by having the so-called "Z" variety of a grill pressed into the stamp, creating tiny indentations in the paper. Although the 1-cent Z-Grill is generally cited as the rarest and most valuable of all US postage stamps, the 15-cent Lincoln Z-Grill is just as rare and the 10-cent Washington Z-Grill scarcely less so.  All three of these stamps were produced at the same time, along with more common Z-grill versions of the contemporary 2-cent, 3-cent, 5-cent and 12-cent stamps (The earliest known postmarks on Z-grill stamps date from January 1868). The "Z" pattern, unique among grill templates used by the Post Office because it incises horizontal ridges into the stamp rather than vertical ridges, was replaced within a very short time, for stamps with the D- and E-Grills were already being postmarked in mid-February.

The purpose of grilling was to permit the canceling ink to be better absorbed into the stamp paper, thus preventing reuse of stamps by washing out the cancellation marks. The use of grills was found to be impractical and they were gradually discontinued after 1870.

Known stamps

There are currently only two known 1-cent 1868 Z-Grills, both with cancellation marks. One is owned by the New York Public Library as part of the Benjamin Miller Collection. This leaves only a single 1-cent 1868 Z-Grill in private hands.

This 1868 1 cent Z-Grill stamp sold for $935,000 in 1998 to Mystic Stamp Company, a stamp dealer. Siegel Auctions auctioned the stamp as part of the Robert Zoellner collection. Zachary Sundman, the eleven-year-old son of Mystic Stamp Company President Donald Sundman, was the individual responsible for wielding the paddle and doing the actual bidding.

Later, in late October 2005, Sundman traded this Z-Grill to financier Bill Gross for a block of four Inverted Jenny stamps worth nearly $3 million.

Both Z-Grills were on display at the National Postal Museum along with the first part of the Benjamin Miller Collection from 27 May 2006 until 1 October 2007.

Stamp numbering
In the Scott catalogue of U. S. Stamps, the 1¢ Z Grill is listed as #85A: it is one of the very few issues that does not bear a unique number but must share its numeral (85) with other stamps of different denominations.  This anomaly arose because Scott created its system long before the Z pattern gained general recognition as a separate variety of grill (which did not occur until the 1910s).  Accordingly, Scott assigned capital letters to the Z Grill denominations and inserted them into the catalogue after #85 (the 3¢ D Grill). The 1¢ Z Grill appeared as #85A and the 2¢ through 15¢ Z Grills were designated 85B through 85F.  This expedient enabled Scott to retain the existing numbers for all subsequent stamps, beginning with the E Grill issues (#86-91).

Characteristics
As previously stated, the Z grill is distinguished by horizontal ridges rather than the vertical ones of other, more common, grills.
Additionally, the number of points vertically and horizontally matter, but existing reference material can be confusing.
The 2019 Scott catalogue and prior issues list the Z Grill as 11x14mm (13 to 14 by 17 to 18 points). The Philatelic Foundation published a dissenting paper in Opinions IV. In this article, Jerome Wagshal argues that Z grills are always clearly struck and 18 points in height
is the norm, as well as pointing out
that the two subtypes he has identified can be perceived as 13 points or 14 points depending on certain details of how
they were struck. Beginning with the 2020 Scott Catalogue the listing for the number of horizontal points has been
changed.

See also
 Inverted Jenny
 List of notable postage stamps

References

External links 
 Classification and photos of grills of US stamps
 More information about the Benjamin Franklin 1-cent Z Grill

Postage stamps of the United States
1868 works
Cultural depictions of Benjamin Franklin
1868 in the United States